Five Three One - Double Seven O Four is the 19th UK studio album by the English rock/pop group the Hollies. When rendered as digits, the album title is the band's name upside down in digital number view (it would appear like this: hOLLIES or 5317704). Guitarist Terry Sylvester credits this idea.

Overview and recording
Singer Allan Clarke left The Hollies after the release of their previous album A Crazy Steal in 1978. During his absence, the band worked with Gary Brooker of the Procol Harum. They recorded his (and Keith Reid) song Harlequin with B. J. Wilson on drums, due to the illness of the Hollies’ drummer Bobby Elliott. The group even considered offering Gary Brooker the lead singer position, but Allan Clarke eventually returned to the group and the remainder of the album was recorded. Brooker, incidentally, later recorded the opening track Say It Ain't So, Jo, having heard it on the sessions for this album (it was also recently covered by Roger Daltrey).

Most recently, the Hollies also worked with their longtime producer Ron Richards, who was seriously ill at the time and left the music business after completing the album. Drummer Bobby Elliott later stated: “The massive consoles at Abbey Road were now computerised, and engineer Mike Jarratt had a 16- and a 24-track machine linked together. Very impressive, but advancing technology, ironically, meant that it was now taking much longer to mix a Hollies track.” The band recorded several new songs by various authors (Murray Head, Tony Hymas, Pete Brown, David Pomeranz) and only one, Satelite Three, written by singer Allan Clarke (and his songwriting partner Gary Benson). The album contains mostly ballads, occasionally country music (Stormy Waters) or mid-tempo funk (Boys in the Band). The song It's Everyone Of Us was later featured in the famous London stage musical Time and sir Cliff Richard recorded hit version in 1985. In 2003, the Hollies included the song in their concert setlist. Two more tunes were omitted from the final album: Sanctuary (released in 1988) and Lovin' You Ain't Easy (released in 1998). Allan Clarke sings lead on all tracks except Boys in the Band and Harlequin both sung by Terry Sylvester.

Release and reception
The Space-themed sleeve design was fashioned by Jack Wood (who made artwork for Status Quo, Thin Lizzy or The Sensational Alex Harvey Band). LP was issued by Polydor in the UK in March 1979, but the album was overshadowed by the success of the compilation The Hollies: 20 Golden Greats, which reached No. 2 in the UK chart shortly before. 5317704 was also released in Australia, Canada, Netherlands, New Zealand, Ireland, France, Scandinavia, and Germany. Although the Hollies went on tour to promote both albums, 5317704 failed to chart.  The extracted single Something to Live For (originally recorded by Jack Bruce on his LP How's Tricks) also failed. The prestigious music magazine Melody Maker named the record "terminally depresing".

Track listing

Side 1
"Say It Ain't So, Jo" (Murray Head)
"Maybe It's Dawn" (Tony Hymas, Pete Brown)
"Song Of the Sun" (Tony Hymas, Pete Brown)
"Harlequin" (Gary Brooker, Keith Reid) Lead vocal: Terry Sylvester; Drums: B.J. Wilson 
"When I'm Yours" (Murray Head)

Side 2
"Something To Live For" (Tony Hymas, Pete Brown)
"Stormy Waters" (David M. White) Harmonica: Allan Clarke 
"Boys in the Band" (Pete Brown) Lead vocal: Terry Sylvester 
"Satellite Three" (Allan Clarke, Gary Benson)
"It's In Everyone Of Us" (David Pomeranz)

Personnel 

 Allan Clarke – lead vocals, guitar, harmonica
 Terry Sylvester – guitar, vocals
 Tony Hicks – guitar, banjo, mandolin, bass, keyboards, vocals
 Bernie Calvert – bass, keyboards
 Bobby Elliott – drums
 Pete Wingfield – keyboards
 Hans Peter Arnesen – keyboards 
 Gary Brooker – keyboards  (vocals on "Harlequin", starting at 3:15)
 Tony Hymas – keyboards, string and horn arrangements 
 B.J. Wilson – drums

References

See also

1979 albums
The Hollies albums
Polydor Records albums
Albums produced by Ron Richards (producer)